The Southern Conference Baseball Player of the Year is a baseball award given to the Southern Conference's most outstanding player. The award was first given after the 1972 season.  The Southern Conference began sponsoring baseball in 1947.

Key

Winners

Winners by school

References

Player Of The Year
NCAA Division I baseball conference players of the year